Coelogaster is an extinct genus of prehistoric bony fish that lived from the early to middle Eocene.

References

Scombridae
Eocene fish